The 1980–81 FA Vase was the seventh season of the FA Vase, an annual football competition for teams in the lower reaches of the English football league system.

Whickham, of Tyne and Wear, won the competition, beating Willenhall Town in the final.

Third round

Fourth round

Fifth round

Replay

Quarter-finals

Replays

Semi-finals

Whickham won 2-1 on aggregate.

Willenhall Town won 3–1 on aggregate.

Final

References

FA Vase
FA Vase
FA Vase seasons